Melung is a Rural municipality located within the Dolakha District of the Bagmati Province of Nepal. The municipality spans  of area, with a total population of 20,210 according to a 2011 Nepal census.

On March 10, 2017, the Government of Nepal restructured the local level bodies into 753 new local level structures. The previous Pawati, Ghang Sukathokar, Bhedapu, Dandakharka, and Melung VDCs were merged to form Melung Rural Municipality. Melung is divided into 7 wards, with Bhedapu declared the administrative center of the rural municipality.

Melung VDC
Melung (the previous VDC) is now a part of Melung Rural Municipality. It was a separate village development committee (VDC) from 1990 to 2017. This whole village is now a ward (ward no. 7) of Melung RM. Some area from Melung VDC were carved out and merged with Dandakharka to form ward no. 6 of Melung RM.

Ward division
Melung RM is divided into 7 wards as below:

References

External links
official website of the rural municipality
UN map of the municipalities of Dolakha District

Populated places in Dolakha District
Rural municipalities in Dolakha District
Rural municipalities of Nepal established in 2017